The Finlandia Hall is a congress and event venue in the centre of Helsinki on the Töölönlahti Bay, owned by the City of Helsinki. The building, which was designed by architect Alvar Aalto, was completed in 1971. Every detail in the building is designed by Aalto. The designs were completed in 1962, with building taking place between 1967 and 1971. The Congress Wing was designed in 1970 and built in 1973–1975. In 2011, the building was expanded with new exhibition and meeting facilities. Finlandia Hall is known as the venue for the OSCE Summit (Conference on Security and Co-operation in Europe) held in August 1975, attended by 35 world leaders, including the leader of the Soviet Union, Leonid Brezhnev, and the President of the United States, Gerald Ford.

The inauguration of the Finlandia Hall was celebrated on 2 December 1971. The inauguration concert included the first performance of Einojuhani Rautavaara's Meren tytär (‘Daughter of the Sea’) and Aulis Sallinen's Symphony (opus 24), as well as Sibelius's violin concerto with Isaac Stern as the violin soloist of the Helsinki Philharmonic Orchestra.

Architecture
 

The Finlandia Hall and its Congress wing was the only part of a plan for a grand new monumental centre for Helsinki around the Töölö Bay area, designed by Alvar Aalto from 1959 to 1976, to actually be built. The main feature of the Finlandia Hall building is a tower-like section with a sloping roof. Alvar Aalto's idea behind the design was that a high empty space would provide better acoustics. A lattice ceiling hides the space to the audience but it allows the creation of the same deep post-echo as tall church towers. Aalto used Italian Carrara marble in both indoor and outdoor surfaces as a contrast to black granite. For Aalto, the marble was a tie to the Mediterranean culture, which he wanted to bring to Finland.

Finlandia Hall features an optical illusion: the National Museum building on the other side of the street seems to rise from the edge of the Finlandia Hall tower. The effect is created by a black trapezium on the white marble surface of the Finlandia Hall tower. The trapezium has been measured to fit the rising tower of the National Museum when the Finlandia Hall is viewed from the eastern shore of the Töölönlahti Bay. Aalto liked to create optical illusions. Another example of this can be found on the pedestrian path behind the library building of the Helsinki University of Technology (current Aalto University) in Espoo.

The interior design of the building is a tribute to the principle of the Gesamtkunstwerk, that is, the total work of art. The design of each lamp, piece of furniture, panel, flooring material and decorative board is a reflection of Aalto's maturity resulting from his long career as an architect as well as designer of lamps, furniture and fixtures such as door handles. All the materials speak the language of nature, without technically artificial tones. This is because Aalto's basic view was that architecture should create a frame for human beings. In the Finlandia Hall, the focus is not on extraordinary forms or ostentatious interior, but rather on the audience and on the performers. According to Aalto, the audience at the Finlandia Hall need not dress up like people used to in the opera house foyers and gilded concert halls of the old days. What people wear should be as genuine and natural as the environment in the building.

Main building
The main building houses the Main Auditorium (seats 1700), Helsinki Hall (seats 340), Terrace Hall (seats 250), Elissa Hall (seats 130), Aurora Hall (seats 894), Veranda (seats 1700) and Finlandia Restaurant, as well as Cafe Veranda (open to the public) and Galleria Veranda.

Main Auditorium
 
The interior of the Finlandia Hall displays many themes that are typical of Aalto. The Main Auditorium was originally designed as a concert hall, and it is a simplified version of the concert hall in the Aalto Theatre, i.e. the Essen Opera House in Germany.

The Main Auditorium has been a popular venue for meetings, congresses, festivities, concerts and events from the very beginning. The Auditorium seats 1700 people, 1200 in the stalls and 500 in the balcony. The floor is oak parquet and the blue sections of the wall are Finnish birch. The stage is 14 metres wide. It consists of several modular platforms. In the middle, there is an elevator to the storage rooms located on two floors underneath the stage. The curtain is designed by Dora Jung, a Finnish textile designer.

The Main Auditorium has served as a venue for several international summit meetings, for instance for the meeting of the Second Stage of Organization for Security and Co-operation in Europe in 1975, which was attended by General Secretary Brezhnev from the Soviet Union and President Ford from the United States. In the meeting, every second seat row was removed to accommodate desks for the participants.

Several other heads of states have also given speeches in the Main Auditorium, e.g. President Ronald Reagan, General Secretary Mikhail Gorbachev, President George H. W. Bush, Pope John Paul II, and the 14th Dalai Lama.

There has been a lot of discussion about the acoustics of the Main Auditorium. In the beginning, there were problems, mainly because Aalto wanted the space to be like a medieval church in which the acoustics are known to be good. The tower section shown here was fully open. In the reparations that took place later, the ceiling was lowered to its present height, and the height of the stage was increased by half a metre. The doors of the Main Auditorium are covered with material made of horsehair. The organ in the Auditorium, made by the Kangasala Organ Factory, was the first concert hall organ in Finland. The front section of the organ was also designed by Alvar Aalto.

Piazza
Piazza is a large foyer that has much natural light. The name goes back to Italy, the country that Aalto admired greatly, its market places and squares where people gathered to see each other. The colours are subdued and quiet. The floor or the foyer is covered with high-quality English wool carpeting.

Helsinki hall
The Helsinki Hall with its 340 seats and pleasant foyer is an excellent venue for various events. The Helsinki Hall has features that resemble the church hall that Aalto designed for Detmerode, Wolfsburg, Germany. Especially the roof is copied from it. The “panels” in the ceiling are American Oregon pine. A closer look at the walls of the Helsinki Hall shows that there is only one sharp angle in the Hall.

Finlandia Restaurant
The Finlandia Restaurant consists of three dining rooms separated by movable walls. As a single space, the restaurant seats 380 people and accommodates a cocktail party for 650 people. Combining the restaurant and the adjoining foyer allows the arrangement of catering for almost 1300 people and cocktail parties for up to 2500 people.

Congress Wing
The Congress Wing was completed in 1975. The special feature of the Congress Wing is the “waves” of the facade that give the building unique beauty and vivacity. The outer walls of the Wing are not direct. They curve, following the form of the terrain. On the one hand, Aalto wanted to save most of the trees on the site, but on the other hand, he wanted to avoid the monotony of direct walls. The Congress Wing contains convertible halls A, B and C, as well as several (total 13) smaller meeting rooms.

Veranda
 
 
The Veranda extension of the Finlandia Hall, which was completed in 2011, is a conversion of the covered parking lot and ramp on the Karamzininranta side of the main building. The main idea of the design was a feeling of a covered outdoor space, simple. light and neutral. For example, the original nature and material of the ceiling, wall and floor surfaces were not changed if possible. The construction work was implemented in cooperation with the Finnish National Board of Antiquities. The number of new fixed elements was minimised to allow the use of the space for a large number of different functions, exhibitions, banquets, etc. The hall can be divided into spaces of various sizes by means of movable walls. Veranda's floor area, 2200 m2, provides meeting space for 240–310 people. It allows the arrangement of catering for 1000 people and cocktail parties for 1700 people. The main architect for Veranda is Jyrki Iso-Aho and the interior design is by Jaakko Puro Oy. Apart from design, the leading idea in furnishing is lightness, movability and suitability for various purposes. Veranda also houses Cafe Veranda, which is open to the public, and Galleria Veranda. Both Veranda and Cafe Veranda offer a good view to the Töölönlahti Bay.

Company
The Finlandia Hall is operated by an independent company. On 1 June 2008, the management organisation of the Finlandia Hall was changed into a limited liability company, Finlandia-talo Oy. The whole share capital of the company is owned by the City of Helsinki. The Managing Director of the company is Johanna Tolonen.

Managing Directors of the Finlandia Hall
 Bengt Broms 1971–1982
 Carl Öhman 1982–1988
 Matti Kivinen 1988–2000
 Auni Palo 2000–2011
 Johanna Tolonen 2012–

References

External links

 Webpage of Finlandia Hall
 Architecture of Finlandia Hall – for a more detailed essay on the architecture of Finlandia Hall.

Buildings and structures completed in 1971
Alvar Aalto buildings
Buildings and structures in Helsinki
Concert halls in Finland
Culture in Helsinki
Landmarks in Finland
Modernist architecture in Finland
Tourist attractions in Helsinki
Töölö
1971 establishments in Finland